Amon Carter Riverside High School is a grade 9-12 high school in Fort Worth, Texas. It has over 1,200 students.

Carter Riverside is a Texas Education Agency recognized school in the Fort Worth Independent School District.

Athletics

Wrestling 
Carter-Riverside High School is a member of District 6 Region 2 of the UIL wrestling alignment.  Carter- Riverside is one of only 7 FWISD schools to have a wrestling program.  In 2017 the program made Fort Worth ISD history when Jacqueline Bunyavong (5A girls, 102 lbs) became the school's and district's first wrestling state champion, defeating the defending champion by decision.

Clubs and activities

Debate 
The Carter-Riverside debate team has been growing in popularity since it was restarted in school year 2015–2016. Students can choose to take Debate as an elective or speech credit and sign up to compete at local, regional, state, and national competitions. The team is self-funded through student fundraisers. Notable accolades include winning the Trimble Tech tournament in January 2017 and placing third in districts in March 2017 behind Grapevine High School and Colleyville High School.

Yearbook 
The Carter-Riverside yearbook is both a class and an extracurricular opportunity for students who want to be involved in creating the yearbook. Students take photos of events, interview people on campus, document student life, and complete all of the design and layout.

Programs of Choice
The school has three POC's (Programs of Choice).  They are the Eagle Scholar's Academy, Medical Academy and Information Technology.

References

Public high schools in Fort Worth, Texas
Public high schools in Texas
Amon Carter family